We Sing of Only Blood or Love (erroneously titled We Sing Only of Blood or Love on the vinyl format) is the debut solo album by American singer and songwriter Dax Riggs. It was slated to be the next Deadboy and the Elephantmen album before that band's dissolution. Riggs decided to release it under his own name, on August 21, 2007. Matt Sweeney provided a combination of guitar, bass, piano and backing vocals for all of the tracks, as well as producing the record.

We Sing of Only Blood or Love is dominated by dark neo-blues rock songwriting structures, and also contains heavy metal, folk music, gothic rock, protopunk, and some experimental material. The album is a continuation of Riggs' musical evolution since fronting the Louisiana sludge metal band Acid Bath in the 1990s. Riggs uses a trained, rich vocal style most frequently sung in a blues-influenced baritone rasp. His lyrics contain various stylistic elements of metaphor and imagery, and touch upon personal and poetic subjects such as death, love, Satan, nocturnal hallucinations, mortality, phantoms, and morbidity.

Track listing 

Demon Tied to a Chair in My Brain
Didn't Know Yet What I'd Know When I Was Bleedin'
Night is the Notion
Radiation Blues
The Terrors of Nightlife
A Spinning Song
Truth in the Dark
Ouroboros
Living is Suicide
Forgot I Was Alive
Ghost Movement
Dog-Headed Whore
The Wall of Death
Scarlett of Heaven nor Hell
Dethbryte
Dream or Be Dead (Vinyl only)

Credits 

The album features, along with Dax Riggs, members of the last incarnation of Deadboy and the Elephantmen: Alex Bergeron (bass), Adam Clement (drums), and Sean Keating (keyboards).

It was produced by Matt Sweeney, who also contributed guitar to some tracks.

The final track, Dethbryte, was remixed by Andrew W.K.

All songs are by Dax Riggs except Wall of Death, originally by Richard Thompson.

References

Dax Riggs albums
2007 albums